NXT  may refer to:

Sports
 Indy NXT ("NXT"), open-wheel open-cockpit motorsports series, formerly Indy Lights ("Lights")

Professional wrestling
 WWE NXT, a professional wrestling television program produced by WWE that began in 2010
 NXT (WWE brand), WWE's Florida-based brand and former developmental territory
 NXT UK, the British spin-off of NXT featuring the namesake brand
 NXT UK (WWE brand) WWE's United Kingdom-based brand

Groups, companies, organizations
 NextDC (ASX ticker NXT), Australian data centre operator
 Centre Alliance, an Australian political party formerly known as the Nick Xenophon Team that traded under the NXT brand

Products
 Nxt, a cryptocurrency started in November 2013
 Lego Mindstorms NXT, a kit for building robots with Lego bricks created in 2006
 Sharp Nemesis NXT, a kit-built racing aircraft
 NXT, a COVID-aware smart-workplace platform developed by NetSol Technologies

Other
 NXT record, an obsolete DNS resource record type; see List of DNS record types#NXT

See also

 
 Next (disambiguation)